"The Hidden Masters" and "Arcane Montane" are songs by American heavy metal band The Sword. The lyrics for both were written by vocalist and guitarist J. D. Cronise, and the music is credited to the full band. Produced by J. Robbins, the songs are featured on The Sword's 2012 fourth studio album Apocryphon, and were released together as a single on April 8, 2014.

Composition and style
In a favorable review of Apocryphon for website PopMatters, Dean Brown noted that both tracks "lean lyrically on fantasy, but there is some apocalyptic tension in [writer J. D.] Cronise's words", adding that on "Arcane Montane" the singer "begs for assistance from the mountains while they [sic] band shake the ground with some Clutch-style swagger". Consequence of Sound's Jon Hadusek also praised the album for its apocalyptic themes, highlighting "The Hidden Masters" as a track on which Cronise "sets the grim scene" and "Arcane Montane" as featuring "fantastical motifs".

Release and packaging
It was announced in February 2014 that "The Hidden Masters" and "Arcane Montane" would be released as a double single on 7" vinyl, with remixes of each track by Dylan C included as B-sides. "The Hidden Masters" was pressed on green vinyl and "Arcane Montane" was pressed on pink vinyl. The set was released on April 8, 2014.

Track listing

Personnel

The Sword
J. D. Cronise – vocals, guitar, production
Kyle Shutt – guitar, production
Bryan Richie – bass, synthesizers, production
Santiago "Jimmy" Vela III – drums, percussion, production

Additional personnel
J. Robbins – production, engineering, mixing
Greg Calbi – mastering
J. H. Williams III – design, illustrations
Todd Klein – design assistance

References

Hidden Masters, The
Hidden Masters, The
Hidden Masters, The